Phoebe Thomas (born 12 April 1983) is a British actress.

Thomas made a name for herself playing Holly Curran on Night and Day from 2001 to 2003. In 2005 she went on to star in the Five soap, Family Affairs, as homeless Jane Hughes. She has also had a role in Channel 4 comedy Teachers and played nurse Maria Kendall in BBC medical drama Holby City from 28 November 2006 to 19 May 2010. She is also playing Hetty Feather in the stage adaptation of Hetty Feather. She was "Thea Holmes" in Death in Paradise Series 3 Episode 2 (The Wrong Man).

She has previously acted the role of Lady Godiva in an independent film based on a script by Vicky Jewson.

Filmography

Film

Television

References

External links

 Lady Godiva movie website
British Film Magazine article featuring Phoebe

Living people
1983 births
British television actresses